The 2008–09 Vijay Hazare Trophy was the seventh season of the Vijay Hazare Trophy, a List A cricket tournament in India. It was contested between 27 domestic cricket teams of India, starting in February and finishing in March 2009. In the final, Tamil Nadu beat Bengal by 66 runs to defend win their 3rd title.

References

External links
 Series home at ESPN Cricinfo

Vijay Hazare Trophy
Vijay Hazare Trophy